Săcel ( (after 1901), Szacsal (until 1901);  or Sitshl) is a commune in Maramureș County, Maramureș, Romania. Composed of a single village, Săcel, it is the last locality up the Iza Valley. From here one can get to the Vișeu Valley through Dealul Moiseiului Pass (towards the northeast) and to Transylvania (specifically Năsăud, towards the south) through Dealul Ștefāniței Pass, which separates the Țibleș and Rodna Mountains.

Săcel pottery
Săcel is famous for its red, unglazed pottery produced by  ancient, Dacian techniques that date to more than 2000 years ago. In the 21st century, an ancient Roman-type oven or kiln is used to cure the clay. Săcel pots are manufactured in Dacian style and they are ornamented using mineral elements.

References

External links

Communes in Maramureș County
Localities in Romanian Maramureș